The Central Arecanut and Cocoa Marketing and Processing Co-operative Limited or CAMPCO was found on 11 July 1973 at Mangalore. Savior of Arecanut farmer and The organisation working on principles of co-operative was found to mitigate the sufferings of arecanut and cocoa growers in Indian states of Karnataka and Kerala. CAMPCO has now extended its services to other states of India like Gujarat, Maharashtra, Uttar Pradesh, Madhya Pradesh, New Delhi, Bihar, Tamil Nadu, Odisha, Assam and Goa also. The CAMPCO has now become multi state co-operative under relevant Indian laws. The organisation is mainly into procurement, marketing, selling and processing of arecanut and cocoa. The company has now entered in Rubber and Black pepper market.  The company also provides guidance for farmers for growing arecanut and cocoa.

History
CAMPCO has its head office at puttur and its Branches spread all over India. The company set up a chocolate manufacturing plant in 1986 at Puttur of Dakshina Kannada district of Karnataka. The Campco chocolate manufacturing unit was inaugurated on 1 September 1986 by then Indian President Giani Zail Singh. The inauguration ceremony was broadcast live on Doordarshan. The plant produces chocolates and other products of cocoa both under its own brand and also for Nestle. In 2016 total production was 18,000 tonnes per annum, with a planned expansion to increase the output to 23,000 tonnes. A similar expansion had also been planned in 2011. The turnover of Campco was a record high of Rs 17400 Million in FY2017-18.
The Campco chocolate factory has built up with new amenity block which was inaugurated by Honorable union minister for commerce and industry Sri. Suresh Prabhu on 21 January 2018. On the same day, the "statue of campco founder president Late Sri. Varanashi Subraya Bhat" was also inaugurated. This statue is the main attraction and also the crown for campco. Well setup office along with well equipped production entry area with fulfilling food safety norms, which comply FSSAI, ISO, OHSAS and HALAL certifications.

New Warehouse
The new warehouse infrastructure, will be setting up a godown at Kavu village in Puttur taluk of Dakshina Kannada district. It is 17 km from Puttur City.

See also
 Economy of Mangalore
 Baikampady

References

External internet sites

https://campco.org/
CAMPCOCHOCOLATE internet site
CAMPCO to produce mouth fresheners from tender arecanut- Newskarnataka.com

Economy of Mangalore
Cooperatives in Kerala
Commodity markets in Kerala
1973 establishments in Karnataka